Croughaun Hill ( or Cruachán) is a hill in north County Waterford, Ireland. It is a largely solitary hill to the east of the Comeragh Mountains.

Geography 
The hill has a conical shape, and is geologically composed of conglomerates, sandstone and siltstone which are dated to the Devonian period.

Villages in the surrounding hinterland include Fews, Clonea-Power and Rathgormack.

References

Mountains and hills of County Waterford